Tauron may refer to:

Tauron Group, Polish energy group
Tauron, combat robot from series 9 and 10 of UK Robot Wars
One of the Twelve Colonies in the Battlestar Galactica science fiction franchise